Tricula is a genus of freshwater snails with a gill and an operculum, aquatic gastropod mollusks in the family Pomatiopsidae.

Tricula is the type genus of the tribe Triculuni.

Species 
Species in the genus Tricula include:
 Tricula bambooensis
 Tricula bollingi Davis, 1968
 Tricula chiui - 
 Tricula fujianensis (Liu, et al., 1983)
 Tricula godawariensis Nesemann & Sharma, 2007
 Tricula gravelyi B. Prashad, 1921
 Tricula gregoriana Annandale, 1924
 Tricula hongshanensis Tang et al., 1986
 Tricula horae T. N. Annandale & Rao, 1925
 Tricula hortensis Attwood & Brown, 2003
 Tricula hsiangi Kang, 1984
 Tricula humida
 Tricula jianouensis Cheng et al., 2009
 Tricula ludongbini
 Tricula mahadevensis Nesemann & Sharma, 2007
 Tricula martini Rao, 1928
 Tricula montana Benson, 1843 - type species
 Tricula pingi Kang, 1984
 Tricula taylori Rao, 1928
 Tricula wumingensis Hu et al., 1994
 Tricula xiaolongmenensis

References

External links 
 Davis G. M., Guo Y. H., Hoagland K. E., Chen P. L., Zheng L. C., Yang H. M., Chen D. J. & Zhou Y. F. (1986). "Anatomy and Systematics of Triculini (Prosobranchia: Pomatiopsidae: Triculinae), Freshwater Snails from Yunnan, China, with Descriptions of New Species". Proceedings of the Academy of Natural Sciences of Philadelphia 138(2): 466–575. JSTOR.

Pomatiopsidae
Taxonomy articles created by Polbot